Vincent Krassousky (1902-disappeared in the late 1940s) was a Russian cartoonist who immigrated to France as a refugee. Krassousky's character, Vica, was a sailor, and Vica was also Krassousky's nickname. He is known chiefly for publishing pro-Axis propaganda cartoons for children during the Nazi occupation of France.

History
In 1902 he was born in Kiev (Kyiv), then in the Russian Empire. He had fought with the White Russians during the 1917 Bolshevik Revolution, doing so from the ages of 16 and 18. According to a doctor who examined him as part of a criminal trial, his father died in Bulgaria during the war, he had a negative attitude towards Communist Bolsheviks and that they had killed his mother and sister. Claire Tufts, author of "Vincent Krassousky-Nazi Collaborator or Naïve Cartoonist?", noted that he considered the Soviets responsible for the deaths of his loved ones, he had "an intense, visceral hatred of the Russians" that others in France were aware of. He never fathered children and had not married.

His first commercial artwork was an advertisement for the breakfast drink Banania made in 1933, and he began his Vica comics in a Belgian publication in 1935. He also wrote "The Extraordinary Adventures of Bib and Bob" from the beginning to the middle of 1936, published in Paris-Soir Dimanche.

Krassousky stayed in Paris after the Nazi forces invaded Paris in 1940. He never worked for publishing companies in the area not directly occupied by Nazi Germany, so Tufts stated that "it is not surprising" that Krassousky did not move. Vica comics were published in Gavroche from 1940, until 1942, and then from January 1943 in Le Téméraire, a comics publication for children that aligned with the Axis; as part of the latter Krassousky wrote some comics supporting the Nazi German cause. In the comics the character Vica, in Alaniz's words, "mocked and excoriated England, America, the Bolsheviks, and "Jewish conspiracies."" Claire Tufts stated that the Krassousky comics were "far less offensive" compared to other Le Téméraire comics. Le Téméraire ended on 1 August 1944.

According to Alaniz, the author "may have been mentally deranged". Tufts stated that "[e]ven a cursory look" at the Vica comics made it clear that he "was much more than a naïve cartoonist living and working in Paris during the German occupation."

He was arrested in October 1944 after the liberation of France, and was accused of collaborating with Nazi authorities by making the comics, and was accused of having fascist sympathies by members of the public. He stated that he was innocent, and that a German cartoonist he worked with wrote and/or created the storylines, but he was convicted. He was given a prison sentence of one year and a 1,000 franc fine on 23 February 1945. 
Today evidence has emerged that two Germans worked with Vica for "Vica au Paradis de l'URSS," "Vica contre les Services Secrets Anglais" and "Vica défie l'Oncle Sam" one to write the captions (Vica was not fluent in French and used to ask his colleagues to correct them) the other to help for the illustrations especially for the several photos included in those albums.

It must be stressed that Vica was the only illustrator from Le Téméraire to be criminally punished, all of his colleagues like Liquoi, Erik and Josse were hired without moral issues by Vaillant, a new children's comic magazine controlled by the French Communist Party. A police report noted "The comic Vaillant which is published is a mere copy of Le Téméraire: Only the title was changed."

However many collaborators from Le Téméraire received death threats during the summer 1944 and later some of them were convicted of relatively minor crimes and given various sentences.

A police report mentioned "Immediately after the Liberation, the premises of Le Téméraire [at] 116 rue Réaumur were searched and occupied by communist cells self-branded CADI ("Committee for Action and Defense of Immigrants")."

When freed from jail Vica published some comics in Cadet Journal(1946) under the pen name Tim. In the late 1940s Krassousky disappeared.

Vica
The Vica comics starred Vica, a sailor described by José Alaniz, author of Komiks: Comic Art in Russia, as being similar to Popeye. Other characters were Tatave; Kamphara, an African character; and several anthropomorphic animal characters.

Works
 Les aventures de Vica. Editions , Liège. 1935.
 Vica au Pôle Nord. Studio André Teixier, 1935; réédition: Editions , Liège. 1936.
 Poum Plum. Editions , Liège. 1936.
 Vica au fond d'un volcan. Editions , Liège. 1937.
 Vica fait de la peinture. Editions , Liège. 1937.
 Me voici scaphandrier. Editions , Liège. 1938.
 Histoire du joyeux Yabon le petit Négrillon, 1939.
 Vica au paradis de l'URSS ("Vica in the Paradise of the USSR"). Editions Dompol, 1942.
 The comic portrays Madame Angleterre (Mrs. England) tormenting a bear representing Russia by injecting a virus with Vladimir Lenin and Joseph Stalin, and she is assisted by Leon Trotsky, who is a Jewish caricature. Tufts describes Madame Angleterre was an "old hag". The spread of Communism continues with the alliance of Jewish people, Soviet Union, and the United Kingdom. After Tatave decides to adopt Communist ideals, Vica comes to the Soviet Union but leaves only after being enslaved for a time. Vica tells Tatave that Soviet Russia had problems, but Tatave does not believe him. He takes Tatave to the "Le Bolchevisme contre l'Europe" (Bolshevism against Europe) exposition to watch "Au Paradis des Soviets", which documents poor conditions in the Communist Soviet Union. Tatave, now despising Stalin, angrily attacks the film screen.
 Vica contre le Service Secret Anglais ("Vica against the English Secret Service") (the title on the cover page is: Vica contre l'Intelligence Service. Editions Dompol, 1942.
 Whilst on a spying mission, Vica travels to the United Kingdom and humiliates Winston Churchill after a fight, while Tatave does the same to Joseph Stalin. Krassousky uses his Vica character to criticize the British Empire, and this comic also discusses Anglo-French relations, stating that France is threatened by the alliance between Jewish people, the Soviet Union, and the United Kingdom. It also advocates for the construction of the Canal des Deux-Mers. The comic portrays Madame Angleterre and a Jewish caricatured agent working for her, and it shows her adding the Hammer and Sickle and the Star of David to the Union Jack. Vica, attempting to cure Madame Angleterre of the virus, attacks her. At the end of the story Vica and Tatave help build the Trans-Saharan Railway.
 Vica défie l'Oncle Sam ("Vica defies Uncle Sam"). Editions Coloniales et Métropolitaines, 1943.
 In this comic Vica and Tatave use a telescope to see the situation in the United States. A Jewish advisor of United States President Franklin D. Roosevelt, Lévy, is described as "the spokesman for the American Jew". Roosevelt begins war preparation efforts, including releasing inmates at Sing Sing Prison to be used as soldiers, after Lévy encourages him to do so. First Lady of the United States Eleanor Roosevelt moves the Statue of Liberty away and stands in its place out of jealousy; Tufts stated that the comic shows the First Lady as "a frumpy old housewife". The comic states that German workers are happy while U.S. workers are unhappy and rioting. In addition the French ocean liner SS Normandie is destroyed in the harbor of New York after the U.S. military seizes it. Vica and Tatave travel to Sub-Saharan Africa and plant a cacti patch to foil the United States's war efforts. The U.S. invades North Africa, killing and enslaving locals. When the U.S. military moves south, Vica and Tatave force Uncle Sam out of his aircraft, and as he parachutes, he lands in the cacti patch they planted. Vica and Tatave consider Uncle Sam's defeat to be revenge for the loss of the SS Normandie.
 Pousse-Tout et Passe-Partout (under the pseudonym "Tim"), 1946.

See also
List of people who disappeared

References
 Tufts, Clare (2004). "Vincent Krassousky-Nazi Collaborator or Naïve Cartoonist?" International Journal of Comic Art. Volume 6, Number 1. Spring 2004. pp. 18–36.

Reference notes

Further reading
French:
 Ory, Pascal. Le Petit Nazi illustré: Vie et survie du Téméraire (1943-1944) (Collection Histoires/Imaginaires). Éditions Albatros, 1979: Paris. Preface by Léon Poliakov. 2nd Edition Review and Addition: Éditions Nautilus, 2002 (Paris): .
 Ragache, Gilles. Un illustré sous l'occupation : le Téméraire. Revue d'histoire moderne et contemporaine, 2000. No. 47-4, pp. 747–767.
 Ragache, Gilles. Un illustrateur sulfureux des années 1930 et 1940 : Vica. Clefs pour l'Histoire, April–June 2000, No. 8.
 Tibéri, Jean-Paul. Vica (Collection "Regards"). , 2012.

External links
 Vica Nazi Propaganda Comics. Duke University Digital Repository, David M. Rubenstein Rare Book & Manuscript Library.

1902 births
1940s deaths
1940s missing person cases
Missing person cases in France
Russian comics artists
Year of death missing